is an Gaelic (Irish) word meaning 'sanctuary, boundary'. It denotes land belonging to Irish early Christian monasteries and churches on which right of sanctuary prevailed. 
The word is common in many place names in Ireland.

Etymology 
It is derived from Latin  meaning 'goal, end point or boundary'. In ancient Rome, Terminus was the name of the deity who presided over boundaries and landmarks. The placement of s in the Irish landscape suggests they were also associated with transit at boundaries across rivers and bays. Cattle and other moveable forms of wealth were often gathered in them, as mentions of raids on s attest.
s were often marked by stone boundary markers. A famous example is Cross Inneenboy at Roughan Hill near Kilfenora in county Clare.

Description 
s were usually on good land and were farmed by the comharba or airchinnech (lay administrator of ecclesiastical land) of the monastery and his  (extended family). This was a position passed down in a family. Termonn land was exempt from secular taxation. The  was expected to maintain a guesthouse (bruiden) in exchange for his privileges. The  land was often divided into strips called columns.
For example, in an agreement drawn up in 1568 between members of the  family of Dysert it is recorded that: "each freeholder of the sept or lineage of the O'Deas living on the eighteen columns of the said Termon of Dishert must come and build their own houses and keep their respective residences" etc.

Examples
 Termon, the sanctuary, County Donegal
 Tarmonbarry, the sanctuary of (Saint) Berach, County Roscommon
 Termonfeckin, the sanctuary of (Saint) Feichín
 Termmonmaguirk, the sanctuary of the McGurks, Carrickmore, County Tyrone
 Ardtermon, the high sanctuary, originally in the túath of Cairbre Drom Cliabh, now in County Sligo
 Tarmon, County Clare
 Abbey of Tarmon, Drumkeeran, County Leitrim

References

Irish words and phrases